Renato Panciera (8 April 1935 – 15 August 2001) was an Italian sprinter. He competed in the men's 4 × 400 metres relay at the 1960 Summer Olympics.

References

External links
 

1935 births
2001 deaths
Athletes (track and field) at the 1960 Summer Olympics
Italian male sprinters
Olympic athletes of Italy
Place of birth missing
Italian Athletics Championships winners
20th-century Italian people